Clue of the Silver Key is a 1961 British crime film directed by Gerard Glaister and starring Bernard Lee, Lyndon Brook and Finlay Currie. It is based on the novel The Clue of the Silver Key by Edgar Wallace. Part of the Edgar Wallace Mysteries series it was made at Merton Park Studios. The film's sets were designed by the art director Peter Mullins.

Cast
 Bernard Lee as Superintendent Meredith
 Lyndon Brook as Gerry Domford
 Finlay Currie as Harvey Lane
 Jennifer Daniel as Mary Lane
 Patrick Cargill as Binny
 Derrick Sherwin as Quigley
 Anthony Sharp as Mike Hennessey
 Stanley Morgan as Sgt. Anson
 Sam Kydd as Tickler
 Harold Scott as Crow
 John Kidd as Mr. Hardwick
 Robert Sansom as Police Doctor
 Patricia Haines as Policewoman
 Eve Eden as Secretary
 Clifford Earl as Detective

References

Bibliography
 Goble, Alan. The Complete Index to Literary Sources in Film. Walter de Gruyter, 1999.

External links

1961 films
British crime films
1961 crime films
Films set in London
Merton Park Studios films
Films based on British novels
Edgar Wallace Mysteries
1960s English-language films
1960s British films